Gajim  is an instant messaging client for the XMPP protocol which uses the GTK toolkit. The name Gajim is a recursive acronym for Gajim's a jabber instant messenger. Gajim runs on Linux, BSD, macOS, and Microsoft Windows. Released under the GPL-3.0-only license, Gajim is free software. A 2009 round-up of similar software on Tom's Hardware found version 0.12.1 "the lightest and fastest jabber IM client".

Features 

Gajim aims to be an easy to use and fully-featured XMPP client. Gajim uses PyGTK as GUI library, which makes it cross-platform compatible. Some of its features:
 Group chat support (with MUC protocol)
 Emojis, Avatars, File transfer
 Systray icon, Spell checking
 TLS, OpenPGP and end-to-end encryption support (OpenPGP not available under Windows until version 0.15),
 Transport Registration support 
 Service Discovery including Nodes
 Wikipedia, dictionary and search engine lookup
 Multiple accounts support
 D-Bus Capabilities
 XML Console
 Jingle voice and video support (using the "python-farstream" library, no support in Windows yet)
 OMEMO
 HTTP file upload
Gajim is available in Basque, Bulgarian, Chinese, Croatian, Czech, English, Esperanto, French, German, Italian, Norwegian (Bokmål), Polish, Russian, Spanish, Slovak, Swedish, Ukrainian and others.

Third-party plugins
Gajim supports third-party plugins. Examples include:
 Gajim-OMEMO, adding support for OMEMO.

See also 

 Comparison of instant messaging clients

References

Reviews
 Joe 'Zonker' Brockmeier Review: Gajim Jabber client on Linux.com, September 16, 2005
 Mihai Marinof, Gajim Review. Free Jabber client for Linux. on Softpedia, 7 November 2006

External links

 
 Official wiki
 XMPP Software: Clients
 Unofficial XMPP/Jabber clients and OS usage statistics (5) by Lucas Nussbaum

Free instant messaging clients
Free XMPP clients
Instant messaging clients that use GTK
Software that uses PyGTK
Windows instant messaging clients
Free software programmed in Python
Applications using D-Bus